The Clear Script ((), or just todo) is an alphabet created in 1648 by the Oirat Buddhist monk Zaya Pandita for the Oirat language. It was developed on the basis of the Mongolian script with the goal of distinguishing all sounds in the spoken language, and to make it easier to transcribe Sanskrit and the Tibetic languages.

History 
The Clear Script is a Mongolian script, whose obvious closest forebear is vertical Mongolian. This Mongolian script was derived from the Old Uyghur alphabet, which itself was descended from the Aramaic alphabet. Aramaic is an abjad, an alphabet that has no symbols for vowels, and the Clear Script is the first in this line of descendants to develop a full system of symbols for all the vowel sounds.

Formation 
The Clear Script was developed as a better way to write Mongolian, specifically of the Western Mongolian groups of the Oirats and Kalmyks. It resolved ambiguities in the written language by assigning symbols to vowels, and adding new symbols and diacritics to show vowels and vowel lengths, and to distinguish between voiced and unvoiced consonants. Symbols that were preserved from the traditional Mongolian script were assigned a fixed meaning.

Usage 
The Clear Script was used by Oirat and neighboring Mongols, mostly in the late 17th and early 18th centuries. It was widely used by its creator and others to translate Buddhist works so that they might better spread the Buddhist religion throughout western Mongolia. Though the script was useful for translating works from other languages, especially Tibetan, it was also used more informally, as evidenced by some letters from the late 1690s.

Around the 19th and early 20th centuries, some Altaians in Russia were able utilize the script to read and write texts due to contacts with Mongolian Buddhists.

The script was used by Kalmyks in Russia until 1924, when it was replaced by the Cyrillic script. In Xinjiang, Oirats still use it, although today Mongolian education takes place in Chakhar Mongolian all across China.

Writing in the Clear Script 
This script is a vertical script, as was its 'vertical Mongolian' parent script. Letters and diacritics are written along a central axis. Portions of letters to the right of the axis generally slant up, and portions to the left of the axis generally slant down. Words are delineated by a space, as well as different letter forms. Though most letters only come in one shape, there are some letters that look different depending on where in the word they occur, whether they are initial, medial, or final.

Tables

Vowels

Consonants

Ligatures

See also 
 Mongolian writing systems
 Mongolian script
 Soyombo alphabet

Notes

References

External links 
 Oirat Clear Script at Omniglot
 Traditional Mongolian Notepad (for Windows XP/Vista)

Mongolian writing systems
Alphabets
Kalmyk language